In pathology, dermatopathic lymphadenopathy,  is lymph node pathology due to skin disease.

Cause
Also known as lipomelanotic reticulosis or Pautrier-Woringer disease, represents a rare form of benign lymphatic hyperplasia associated with most exfoliative or eczematoid inflammatory erythrodermas, including pemphigus, psoriasis, eczema, neurodermatitis, and atrophia senilis.

Diagnosis 
Dermatopathic lymphadenopathy is diagnosed by a lymph node biopsy.  It has a characteristic pattern of histomorphology and immunohistochemical staining:
Paracortical histiocytosis
Melanin-laden macrophages
Eosinophils
Plasma cells (medulla of lymph node)

Differential diagnosis
 Cutaneous T cell lymphoma
Hodgkin's lymphoma
Melanoma

Treatment 
The treatment is based on the underlying cause.

See also 
Skin disease
List of cutaneous conditions

References

External links 
Dermatopathic lymphadenitis - pathconsultddx.com.

Cutaneous conditions